Voyage of Terror is a 1998 American made-for-television action-thriller drama film directed by Brian Trenchard-Smith and starring Lindsay Wagner, Michael Ironside, Martin Sheen, and Brian Dennehy. The plot concerns a virus outbreak on a ship.

Premise 
A disease specialist is on a cruise ship with her daughter when a virus breaks out on board. While she communicates with Washington, the Chief Engineer plans a mutiny.

Cast
 Lindsay Wagner as Dr. Stephanie Tauber
 Michael Ironside as McBride
 Martin Sheen as Henry Northcutt
 Horst Buchholz as Captain
 William B. Davis as Dr. Norman Ellisy
 Katherine Isabelle as Aly Tauber
 Nathaniel DeVeaux as James Coleman
 David Lewis as Ned Simon
 Steve Basic as Alex Reid
 Andrew Airlie as Michael
 Brian Dennehy as U.S. President
 Roger A. Cross as Robert Fernandez
 Venus Terzo as Theresa Fernandez
 Aaron Pearl as Randy Haynes
 Gabrielle Miller as Paula Simon

Production 
The film was shot in early 1998. Lindsay Wagner described director Brian Trenchard-Smith as "amazing. I've never seen anybody work so fast, stay so calm, keep such a good attitude. Under these conditions, the feathers usually start flying."

References

External links 

Voyage of Terror at TCMDB

1998 television films
1998 films
1998 action thriller films
1998 drama films
1990s English-language films
Action television films
American thriller television films
American drama television films
Films about viral outbreaks
Films directed by Brian Trenchard-Smith
Films set on cruise ships
The Family Channel (American TV network, founded 1990) original programming
1990s American films